Damián Alfredo Pérez (born 22 December 1988) is an Argentine footballer who plays as a left-back for Arsenal de Sarandí.

Career
Pérez started his professional career playing for Arsenal de Sarandí in a 1–4 defeat to Newell's Old Boys, on 16 March 2008, playing as a left winger. In the 2011 Clausura, he became a regular starter for Arsenal. Playing mainly as a left full back, Pérez totaled 13 games (12 as a starter).

The Argentine defender was also a regular starter for Arsenal in the team's first national league title, the 2012 Clausura, in which he played 17 games (all as a starter), scoring once (in the 14th fixture 4–1 victory over San Martín de San Juan). Pérez also started in the team's victory against Boca Juniors for the 2012 Supercopa Argentina (first edition of the tournament) and was a regular starter in the 2012–13 Copa Argentina winning campaign (including the 3–0 victory against San Lorenzo de Almagro in the final).

After playing 186 games with Arsenal de Sarandí (counting both domestic and international competitions), and despite being wanted by Argentine powerhouses Boca Juniors and River Plate, the full back joined Vélez Sarsfield on a free transfer for the second half of the 2015 Argentine Primera División.

On 18 July 2019, Pérez signed a two-year contract with Spanish club Sporting de Gijón. However, he moved to Godoy Cruz back in Argentina on 26 October 2020. 

On 9 February 2022, Pérez returned to his former club, Arsenal de Sarandí, on a deal until the end of 2022.

Career Statistics

Honours
Arsenal de Sarandí
Argentine Primera División (1): 2012 Clausura
Copa Argentina (1): 2012–13
Supercopa Argentina (1): 2012

References

External links
 Profile at Vélez Sarsfield's official website 
 Damián Pérez – Argentine Primera statistics at Fútbol XXI 
 
 

Living people
1988 births
Sportspeople from Buenos Aires Province
Argentine footballers
Argentine expatriate footballers
Association football defenders
Arsenal de Sarandí footballers
Club Atlético Vélez Sarsfield footballers
Club Tijuana footballers
Colo-Colo footballers
San Lorenzo de Almagro footballers
Sporting de Gijón players
Godoy Cruz Antonio Tomba footballers
Chilean Primera División players
Segunda División players
Argentine Primera División players
Liga MX players
Argentine expatriate sportspeople in Chile
Argentine expatriate sportspeople in Mexico
Argentine expatriate sportspeople in Spain
Expatriate footballers in Chile
Expatriate footballers in Mexico
Expatriate footballers in Spain